n-Propyl chloride (also 1-propyl chloride or 1-chloropropane) is a colorless, flammable chemical compound. It has the chemical formula C3H7Cl and is prepared by reacting n-propyl alcohol with phosphorus trichloride in the presence of a zinc chloride catalyst.

References

Chloroalkanes
Propyl compounds